Ulus District is a district of the Bartın Province of Turkey. Its seat is the town Ulus. Its area is 909 km2, and its population is 21,390 (2021).

Composition
There are three municipalities in Ulus District:
 Abdipaşa
 Kumluca
 Ulus

There are 68 villages in Ulus District:

 Abdurrahman
 Ağaköy
 Akörensöküler
 Aktaş
 Alıçlı
 Alpı
 Arpacık
 Aşağıçamlı
 Aşağıçerçi
 Aşağıdere
 Aşağıemirce
 Aşağıköy
 Bağdatlı
 Bahçecik
 Balıcak
 Buğurlar
 Çavuşköy
 Çerde
 Ceyüpler
 Çubukbeli
 Çubuklu
 Dereli
 Dibektaş
 Dodurga
 Doğanköy
 Döngeller
 Dörekler
 Dorucaşahinci
 Düzköy
 Eldeş
 Elmacık
 Eseler
 Gökpınar
 Güneyören
 Hasanören
 Hisarköy
 Hocaköy
 İbrahimderesi
 İğneciler
 İnceçam
 Isırganlı
 Kadıköy
 Kalecik
 Karahasan
 Karakışla
 Kayabaşı
 Keçideresi
 Kirazcık
 Kirsinler
 Kıyıklar
 Kızıllar
 Köklü
 Konak
 Konuklu
 Kozanlı
 Küllü
 Öncüler
 Sarıfasıl
 Sarnıç
 Şirinler
 Üçsaray
 Ulukaya
 Uluköy
 Yenikışla
 Yeniköy
 Yılanlar
 Yukarıdere
 Zafer

References

Districts of Bartın Province